Foscot is a hamlet in the Cotswolds in the Evenlode valley. It is in a designated Area of Outstanding Natural Beauty. Foscot is in the ecclesiastical parish of St Leonard, Bledington  and is socially integrated with the adjacent Bledington village. The major landowner is Loudham Estates, based at Foxcote Farm. Foxholes, a woodland nature reserve sloping down to the River Evenlode with year-round colour and wildlife interest, is adjacent to Foscot. It is noted for its spring bluebells and abundant bat and bird life and is managed by the Berkshire, Buckinghamshire and Oxfordshire Wildlife Trust.

References

Hamlets in Oxfordshire
West Oxfordshire District